Gustl Gstettenbaur (1 March 1914 – 20 November 1996) was a German stage, film and television actor.

Born in Bavaria, Gustl Gstettenbaur began his career onstage as a child actor in 1927, at the age of thirteen. He went on to play a variety of juvenile roles in German films during the late silent film era. Gstettenbaur's career continued as an adult on stage, film and in television.

Selected filmography

 The Page Boy at the Golden Lion (1928) - Peter Pohlmann, Piccolo
 Spione (1928) - Boy Who Helps No. 326 (uncredited)
 Band of Thieves (1928)
 Volga Volga (1928) - Kolka
 Fight of the Tertia (1929) - Borst
 Woman in the Moon (1929) - Gustav
 Big City Children (1929)
 The Mistress and her Servant (1929) - Hans
 The Eccentric (1929) - Uhrmacherlehrling Toni
 Delicatessen (1930) - Lehrling
 Vienna, City of Song (1930) - Gustl, Pikkolo
 Die zärtlichen Verwandten (1930) - Webers Sohn
 Dolly Gets Ahead (1930) - Boy
 Kohlhiesel's Daughters (1930) - Gustl, Pikkolo
 Madame Pompadour (1931) - Ein kleiner Kadett
 Schubert's Dream of Spring (1931) - Schani, Piccolo in der 'Höldrichsmühle' 
 Queen of the Night (1931)
 The Wrong Husband (1931)
 Elisabeth of Austria (1931)
 Der Storch streikt (1931) - Lehrling
Errant Husbands (1931) - Emil, Lietzows Neffe
 The Night Without Pause (1931) - Bürolehrling bei Stieglitz
 Im Banne der Berge (1931)
 Girls to Marry (1932) - Willi, sein Bruder
 Spoiling the Game (1932) - Gustl Spengler - sein Sohn
 Paprika (1932) - Dienstjunge
 The Secret of Johann Orth (1932) - Der Pikkolo
 The Peak Scaler (1933) - Ein Pikkolo
 The Sandwich Girl (1933) - Paul, Lehrling
 Wedding at Lake Wolfgang (1933) - Peterl, sein jüngerer Bruder
 At the Strasbourg (1934) - Joggeli
 You Are Adorable, Rosmarie (1934) - Peperl, Piccolo im 'Almblick'
 Bei der blonden Kathrein (1934) - Der Kellnerjunge in der Goldenen Gans
 Jungfrau gegen Mönch (1934) - Fritz, Hotelpage
 An Evening Visit (1934) - Ein Bürobote
 Ihr größter Erfolg (1934)
 The Bird Seller (1935)
 Kampf um Kraft (1935)
 Soldaten - Kameraden (1936) - Tupfinger - ein Bayer
 Home Guardsman Bruggler (1936) - Bartl Theissbacher
 The Hunter of Fall (1936) - Toni Donhart
 Das Schweigen im Walde (1937) - Pepi Praxmaler
 Musketier Meier III (1938) - Kriegsfreiwilliger Staden
 Frau Sixta (1939)
 Der Edelweißkönig (1939) - Gidi
 Sommer, Sonne, Erika (1939)
 Der laufende Berg (1941) - Schorsch, der Daxenschmied
 Die heimlichen Bräute (1942) - Ludwig
 The Violin Maker of Mittenwald (1950) - Ludwig
 Border Post 58 (1951) - Grenzjäger Mitterer
 Die Alm an der Grenze (1951) - Ferdl
 The Last Shot (1951) - Jäger Martin
 Heimatglocken (1952)
 The Village Under the Sky (1953) - Schmuggler Toni
 Open Your Window (1953)
 Marriage Strike (1953)
 Wenn ich einmal der Herrgott wär (1954) - Franzl Bergmüller
 Unternehmen Edelweiß (1954) - Hardei
 The Song of Kaprun (1955) - Gustl Feller, Kranführer
The Blacksmith of St. Bartholomae (1955) - Max
 The Dark Star (1955) - Micky
 Silence in the Forest (1955) - Beppi Braxlmaler
 In Hamburg When the Nights Are Long (1956)
 Liebe, Schnee und Sonnenschein (1956) - Kurt Berger, sein Freund
 Her Corporal (1956)
 Melody of the Heath (1956) - Sepp
 Der Schandfleck (1956) - Thomas
 War of the Maidens (1957) - Pecher
 Der Edelweißkönig (1957) - Gidi, Jäger
 Der Pfarrer von St. Michael (1957) - Simmerl
 Jägerblut (1957) - Bastl / Sebastian
 The Cow and I (1959) - Deutscher Soldat (uncredited)
 Drei weiße Birken (1961)
 Vor Jungfrauen wird gewarnt (1962) - Friedrich
 The Merry Wives of Tyrol (1964) - Hotelchef Simmering
 Wiener Schnitzel (1967)
 Stolen Heaven (1974) - Förster Auer (final film role)

Bibliography
 Richards, Jeffrey. Visions of Yesterday. Routledge & Kegan Paul, 1973.

External links

1914 births
1996 deaths
German male child actors
German male film actors
German male silent film actors
German male television actors
People from Straubing
20th-century German male actors